Victor Anagnastopol and Florin Mergea were the defending champions but Anagnastopol decided not to participate.
Mergea played alongside Philipp Marx.
Marius Copil and Victor Crivoi won the final 6–7(8–10), 6–4, [12–10] against Andrei Ciumac and Oleksandr Nedovyesov.

Seeds

Draw

Draw

References
 Main Draw

BRD Brasov Challenger - Doubles
2012 Doubles